James Harrower (18 August 1935 – 28 November 2006) was a Scottish professional footballer.

Born in Alva, Clackmannanshire, Harrower played junior football for Sauchie, Kilsyth Rangers and Bo'ness United before starting his senior career with Hibernian. Liverpool manager Phil Taylor signed him for £11,000. He made his Liverpool debut on 11 January 1958 in a 2nd Division match at Anfield, Fulham were the visitors as Liverpool took the points with a 2–1 victory. The attacking midfielder scored his first goal on 28 March, as Liverpool beat Ipswich Town 3–1.

Harrower was a player with a knack of pulling off amazing trickery with the ball, but like so many players with this ability he lacked the consistency required to play at the highest level; in fact he used to irritate the Anfield crowd who knew what he could do but never saw enough of it. His best season at Liverpool was his first full season 1958–59: he missed just 5 matches and scored 6 goals. Unfortunately for James, the manager who signed him, Taylor, left the club at the end of the campaign and his replacement Bill Shankly decided that change was needed. James was vying for the inside-left position with Jimmy Melia, but midway through the campaign Shankly decided that Melia was the man for the job. Melia kept the position the following season and the future looked bleak for Harrower in a red shirt; in the March 1961 he was on his way, moving to Newcastle United.

He spent a year on Tyneside playing just 6 games, he then moved back to Scotland joining Falkirk. He also played for St Johnstone, Albion Rovers and Alloa Athletic. Harrower also represented Scotland at Under-23 level.

References

External links
 
 Player profile at LFChistory.net
 Obituary at the Alloaadvertiser.com

1935 births
2006 deaths
Scottish footballers
Scotland youth international footballers
Association football inside forwards
Hibernian F.C. players
Liverpool F.C. players
Newcastle United F.C. players
Falkirk F.C. players
St Johnstone F.C. players
Albion Rovers F.C. players
Alloa Athletic F.C. players
Sportspeople from Clackmannanshire
Kilsyth Rangers F.C. players
Bo'ness United F.C. players
Scottish football managers
Albion Rovers F.C. managers
Scotland under-23 international footballers
Scottish Football League managers
Sauchie F.C. players
Scottish Football League players
English Football League players